This is an outline order of battle of the British First Army on 4 May 1943 during the Tunisian Campaign of World War II.
 British First ArmyCommanded by: Lieutenant-General Sir Kenneth Anderson
 V CorpsCommanded by Lieutenant-General Charles Allfrey
 North Irish Horse
 7th Algerian Tirailleurs Regiment (7ème Régiment de Tirailleurs Algériens)
 1st Army Group Royal Artillery
 46th Infantry Division (less 139th Brigade Group)
 78th Infantry Division
 IX CorpsCommanded by: Lieutenant-General Brian Horrocks
 25th Tank Brigade (less two battalions)
 201st Guards Brigade
 2nd Army Group Royal Artillery
 4th Infantry Division
 4th Indian Infantry Division
 6th Armoured Division
 7th Armoured Division
 XIX French CorpsCommanded by General Louis Koeltz
 One Tank Battalion
 
 Division du Maroc
 
 U.S. II Corps (co-ordinated by First Army but under direct control of 18th Army Group)Commanded by: Major General Omar Bradley
 Corps Francs d'Afrique (three battalions)
 One Tabor Moroccan Goumiers
 U.S. 13th Field Artillery Brigade
 U.S. 2626th Coast Artillery Brigade
 1st Armored Division (less one regiment)
 1st Infantry Division
 9th Infantry Division
 34th Infantry Division
 Army Reserve
 1st King's Dragoon Guards
 51st (Leeds Rifles) Royal Tank Regiment
 139th Infantry Brigade
 1st Armoured Division

See also

 List of orders of battle
 British First Army order of battle, 20 April 1943

Footnotes

References
 Anderson, Lt.-General Kenneth (1946). Official despatch by Kenneth Anderson, GOC-in-C First Army covering events in NW Africa, 8 November 1942–13 May 1943 published in 
 

World War II orders of battle
Field armies of the United Kingdom in World War II
1943 in the United Kingdom
British Army in World War II